Saida Menebhi (1952, Marrakesh - 11 December 1977, Casablanca) was a Moroccan poet, high school teacher, and activist with the Marxist revolutionary movement Ila al-Amam. In 1975, she, together with five other members of the movement, was sentenced for seven years of imprisonment for anti-state activity. On November 8th 1977, inside the jail in Casablanca, she participated in a collective hunger strike, and died on the 35th day of the strike at Avicenne Hospital.

Her poetry, collected and published first in 1978, and later again in 2000, is considered a prime example of Moroccan revolutionary and feminist literature. She wrote in French. Translations of a selection of her poems to English were published for the first time in 2021 by See Red Press.

Abduction 
On January 16, 1976, Saida Menebhi was abducted and detained—along with 3 other female militants, Rabea Ftouh, Piera di Maggio and Fatima Oukacha—in the secret Moulay Sherif Prison in Casablanca, now known as a prominent center of torture in the period of King Hassan II. There, they were subjected to a number of different kinds of physical and psychological torture before being transferred to the civilian prison in Casablanca. Menebhi and her comrades Fatima Oukacha and Rabea Ftouh were sentenced to indefinite solitary confinement in the civilian prison of Casablanca.

References

20th-century Moroccan poets
Moroccan feminists
1952 births
1977 deaths
People who died on hunger strike
Ila al-Amam (Morocco) politicians